Kedron is a neighborhood of Peachtree City, Georgia, United States. The village is centered at Lake Kedron.

Shopping
 Kedron Village Shopping Center Georgian Park
 Peachtree Crossing Shopping Center Peachtree Parkway and Highway 54

External links

Populated places in Fayette County, Georgia